Dog Creek may refer to:

Canada
Dog Creek (Fraser River), a tributary of the Fraser River
Dog Creek, British Columbia, a ranching settlement on the Fraser River
Canoe Creek Band/Dog Creek Indian Band, aka the Dog Creek First Nation, a band government in the Dog Creek and Canoe Creek areas of the Cariboo Plateau and Fraser Canyon
Dog Creek Indian Reserve No. 1, an Indian Reserve of the Canoe Creek Band/Dog Creek Indian Band to the east of the settlement
Dog Creek Indian Reserve No. 2, an Indian Reserve of the Canoe Creek Band/Dog Creek Indian Band to the east of the settlement
Dog Creek Indian Reserve No. 3, an Indian Reserve of the Canoe Creek Band/Dog Creek Indian Band to the east of the settlement
Dog Creek Indian Reserve No. 4, an Indian Reserve of the Canoe Creek Band/Dog Creek Indian Band to the east of the settlement
Dog Creek Dome, a mountain near the settlement
Dog Creek, Wiliams Lake, a community just south of and part of the City of Williams Lake, British Columbia
Dog Creek, Fort St. James, a community on the west side of the Stuart River, just south of Fort St. James, British Columbia

United States
Dog Creek (Osage River), a river in Missouri
Dog Creek (Missouri River), a creek in Montana in the Judith Landing Historic District
Dog Creek (Lick Creek), a river in Tennessee